The 2017 Calcutta Football League Premier Division was the 119th season of the Calcutta Premier Division, a state league within the Indian state of West Bengal. The league is divided into two groups – Group A and Group B. The Championship title is awarded only to the Group A winner, while four teams from Group A are relegated to Group B at the end of the season and four teams from Group B are simultaneously promoted to Group A for the next season. The fixtures of Group A kicked off on 12 August 2017, while the fixtures for Group B had kicked off on 7 August 2017.

Premier Division A

Standings

Note: 1=These teams got walkover against Southern Samity and they got 3 point each.

Results

; ; ;

Statistics

Top scorers

Source: kolkatafootball.com
12 goals
 Aser Pierrick Dipanda(MSC)

7 goals
 Kamo Stephane Bayi (MOH)

6 goals
 Ansumana Kromah  (MOH)

5 goals

 Suhair V P(KEB)
 Willis Plaza (KEB)

4 goals

 Sheikh Faiaz (Mohammedan)
Jiten Murmu(Mohammedan)
 Azharuddin Mallick (MOH)
   Mahmoud Amnah (KEB)
 Laldanmawia Ralte (KEB)
 Joel Sunday (PAT)
 Eric Brown (PAT)

3 goals

 Anthony Wolfe (TOL)
 Leonce Dodoz Zikahi (PRL)

2 goals

 Babun Das (PAT)
 Shiltan Dsilva (MOH)
 Carlyle Mitchell (KEB)
 Bazie Armand (RFC)
 Anil Kisku (PRL)
 Sukhwinder Sing (PRL)
 Rajon Burman (CCU)
 Nikhil Kadam (MOH)

1 goal

 Syed Rahim Nabi (PRL)
 Monotosh Chakladar (PAT)
 Atinder Mani (MSC)
 Dipendu Dowary (MSC)
 Chattu Mondal (RFC)
 Bijoy Mandi (SOU)
 Gabriel Fernandes (KEB)
 Nadong Bhutia (PAT)
 Lalrindika Ralte (KEB)
 Samad Ali Mallick (KEB)
 Francis (PRL)
 Jobby Justin (KEB)
 Sumit Das (RFC)
 Dhiman Sinha (CCU)
 Brandon Vanlalremdika (KEB)
 Manandeep Singh (MSC)
 Prohlad Roy (MSC)
 Arijit Singh (CCU)
 Yao Kiosi Bernerd (RAC)
 Satyam Sharma (MSC)
 Nabin Hela (TOL)
 Josef Olanrien (CCU)
 Victor Kamhuka (PAT)

Hat-tricks

4 The player scored 4 goals

Premier Division B

Standings
Notes: After the results of the 10th round, the teams will be divided into two groups of top 6 and bottom 5. The top 6 teams are to play against each other in a single-leg format, called the championship round, while the bottom 5 teams play against each other in the same single-leg format called the relegation round. Each team carried forward their points and other records from the previous 10 matches into the championship or the relegation round.

Results

; ; ;

Top scorers

Source: kolkatafootball.com
9 goals
 MD. Amirul (FCI)

4 goals

 Subhankar Das (GTL)

3 goals
 Subhankar Sardar (KSC)

2 goals

 Saikat Sarkar (KSC)
 Rajib Swaw (GTL)
 Sibra Narjary (USC)
 Saika Shamim (WBP)
 Suva Kumar (GTL)

1 goal

  Kishore Mollick (WBP)
  Krishanu Banerjee (BNR)
  Abinash Nayek (BNR)
  Rabi Das (BNR)
  Safikul Ali Gayen (BNR)
  Dhananjoy Yadav (ARN)
  Rakesh Karmakar (FCI)
  Amit Kundu (GTL)
  Subrata Biswas (GTL)
  mujafar (KSC)

Hat-tricks

References

Calcutta Premier Division
2017–18 in Indian football leagues